Wang Changjiang (born February 1959) is a vice admiral (zhongjiang) of the People's Liberation Army (PLA) who has been deputy commander and chief of staff of the Central Theater Command. He is a delegate to the 13th National People's Congress.

Biography
Wang was born in Luan County (now Luanzhou), Hebei, in February 1959. He enlisted in the People's Liberation Army in 1977. He graduated from the PLA Air Force Fourth Aviation School (now Shijiazhuang Flight College of the PLA Air Force). He served numerous leadership positions in the East Sea Fleet and South Sea Fleet. In 2016, he was given the position of deputy commander of the North Theater Command, he remained in that position until April 2019, when he was transferred to Central Theater Command and commissioned as deputy commander and chief of staff.

He was promoted to the rank of rear admiral (Shaojiang) in 2008 and vice admiral (zhongjiang) in 2017.

References

1959 births
Living people
People from Luanzhou
People's Liberation Army generals from Hebei
Delegates to the 13th National People's Congress